The Habibur Rahman Cabinet led the Caretaker government of Bangladesh from 30 March 1996  to 23 June 1996.

List of  Advisors

References

Cabinets of Bangladesh
Cabinets established in 1996